David Callahan (born 1964/1965) is an American writer and editor. He is the founder and editor of Inside Philanthropy, a digital media site, and Blue Tent Daily, which offers in-depth reporting on progressive organizations and the Democratic Party. Previously, he was a senior fellow at Demos, a public policy group based in New York City that he co-founded in 1999. He is also an author and lecturer. He is best known as the author of the books The Givers and The Cheating Culture.

Early life and education
David Callahan is the son of bio-ethicist Daniel Callahan and psychologist Sidney Callahan. He grew up in Hastings-on-Hudson, New York.

He received his B.A. at Hampshire College, and in 1997 received a PhD in Politics from Princeton University.

Career
Callahan was a fellow at The Century Foundation from 1994 to 1999; his work area was US foreign policy and international affairs. 

In 1999, Callahan co-founded the liberal think tank Demos. He left Demos in 2013 to start Inside Philanthropy.

Inside Philanthropy 
Callahan launched the news website Inside Philanthropy in early 2014. The site's tag line is "Who's Funding What, and Why." It covers news about recent gifts by foundations and major donors, as well as the world of fundraising and trends in philanthropy. The site also includes profiles of funders to help nonprofits find money and publishes a daily newsletter. In addition, it issues its own set of annual awards, the "IPPYs," that include categories such as the "Philanthropist of the Year" and "Foundation President of the Year." Inside Philanthropy is mainly funded by subscriptions, which currently cost $397 a year or $47 a month. The site says that it "has never taken money from the funders we cover and never will."

Writing
In addition to his articles in Inside Philanthropy, Callahan has written articles for The Washington Post, Los Angeles Times, The New York Times, Foreign Policy, The American Prospect, and The Nation.

In 1997 he wrote a political-thriller novel, State of the Union,  in which Islamic terrorists plot to hijack planes and crash them into the Capitol building during the State of the Union address.

In 2002, Callahan wrote the book Kindred Spirits: Harvard Business School's Extraordinary Class of 1949 and How They Transformed American Business, a history of the Harvard Business School Class of 1949. In an interview about the book with The New York Times, Callahan contrasted this earlier group of business leaders, many of whom frowned on conspicuous consumption, with later generations of business leaders more motivated by greed.

A New York Times  review of his 2004 book, The Cheating Culture: Why More Americans Are Doing Wrong to Get Ahead, Chris Hedges called Callahan "a new liberal with old values". The book links the rise in unethical behavior in American society to economic and regulatory trends—particularly growing inequality. The libertarian magazine  Reason criticized Callahan for placing too much blame for cheating on the rise of laissez-faire economics.

His 2007 book The Moral Center examines how a market-based economy, i.e. capitalism, with its elevation of self-interest, undermines values that both liberals and conservatives care about. The American Prospect reviewed the book.

His 2017 book  The Givers: Wealth, Power, and Philanthropy in a New Gilded Age looks at top philanthropists such as Michael Bloomberg and Mark Zuckerberg. The book was widely reviewed, including in The New York Times, The Washington Post, The Wall Street Journal, Financial Times, Time, and The Atlantic. The Givers generated wide discussion and controversy in the world of philanthropy, including in industry publications such as The Chronicle of Philanthropy, Stanford Social Innovation Review, and Philanthropy magazine.

Bibliography

References

External links
Inside Philanthropy
Demos website
The Cheating Culture

1960s births
20th-century American male writers
20th-century American non-fiction writers
21st-century American male writers
21st-century American non-fiction writers
American business and financial journalists
American business writers
American male journalists
American online publication editors
American political writers
Hampshire College alumni
Journalists from New York (state)
Living people
People from Hastings-on-Hudson, New York
Place of birth missing (living people)
Princeton University alumni
Year of birth missing (living people)